Synaptosomal-associated protein 29 is a protein that in humans is encoded by the SNAP29 gene.

Function 

This gene, a member of the SNAP25 gene family, encodes a protein involved in multiple membrane trafficking steps. Two other members of this gene family, SNAP23 and SNAP25, encode proteins that bind a syntaxin protein and mediate synaptic vesicle membrane docking and fusion to the plasma membrane. The protein encoded by this gene binds tightly to multiple syntaxins and is localized to intracellular membrane structures rather than to the plasma membrane. While the protein is mostly membrane-bound, a significant fraction of it is found free in the cytoplasm. Use of multiple polyadenylation sites has been noted for this gene.

Model organisms

Model organisms have been used in the study of SNAP29 function. A conditional knockout mouse line, called Snap29tm1a(EUCOMM)Wtsi was generated as part of the International Knockout Mouse Consortium program—a high-throughput mutagenesis project to generate and distribute animal models of disease to interested scientists.

Male and female animals underwent a standardized phenotypic screen to determine the effects of deletion. Twenty five tests were carried out on mutant mice and two significant abnormalities were observed. No homozygous mutant embryos were identified during gestation, and therefore none survived until weaning. The remaining tests were carried out on heterozygous mutant adult mice; no significant abnormalities were observed in these animals.

Interactions 

SNAP29 has been shown to interact with Syntaxin 3 and EHD1.

SNAP29 was shown to interact with CVB3 and EV-D68 viral protease 3C.

See also 
 CEDNIK Syndrome

References

Further reading

External links 
 

Genes mutated in mice